Stackebrandtia cavernae is a bacterium from the genus of Stackebrandtia which has been isolated from a rock from a karst cave in China.

References 

Actinomycetia
Bacteria described in 2016